Eye strain, also known as asthenopia (from Greek a-sthen-opia), is a common eye condition that manifests through non-specific symptoms such as fatigue, pain in or around the eyes, blurred vision, headache, and occasional double vision. Symptoms often occur after long-term use of computers, digital devices, reading or other activities that involve extended visual tasks which are broadly classified into external and internal symptom factors.

When concentrating on a visually intense task, such as continuously focusing on a book or computer monitor, the ciliary muscles and the extraocular muscles are strained. This causes discomfort, soreness or pain on the eyeballs. Closing the eyes for ten minutes and relaxing the muscles of the face and neck at least once an hour usually relieves the problem.

A page or photograph with the same image twice, but slightly displaced (from a printing mishap, a camera moving during the shot, etc.) can cause eye strain due to the brain misinterpreting the image fault as diplopia and trying in vain to adjust the sideways movements of the two eyeballs to fuse the two images into one.

Eye strain can also happen when viewing a blurred image (including images deliberately partly blurred for censorship), due to the ciliary muscle tightening trying in vain to focus the blurring out.

Symptoms 
 blurred vision
 sore, tired, burning, or itching eyes
 difficulty concentrating
 dry eyes or watery eyes
 eye discomfort
 headaches
 irritated or burning eyes
 sensitivity to bright lights
 tired eyes
 sore eyes

Therapy
Known methods of relieving strain of the ocular muscles are taking periodic breaks by closing the eyes, obtaining good sleep, and proper nutrition.

See also 
 Astigmatism
 Computer vision syndrome
 Eye examination
 Ocular neurosis
 Photophobia
 Vision therapy
 Visual looming syndrome

References

External links 

Visual disturbances and blindness